Dihydromaltophilin, or heat stable anti-fungal factor (HSAF), is a secondary metabolite of Streptomyces sp. and Lysobacter enzymogenes. HSAF is a polycyclic tetramate lactam containing a single tetramic acid unit and a 5,5,6-tricyclic system. HSAF has been shown to have anti-fungal activity mediated through the disruption of the biosynthesis of Sphingolipid's by targeting a ceramide synthase unique to fungi.

Biosynthesis 
The backbone of HSAF is formed through a hybrid PKS-NRPS cluster containing one nonribosomal peptide synthase (NRPS) module and one polyketide synthase (PKS) module. The single PKS module functions in a non-canonical fashion in that it is an iterative type I PKS responsible for the generation of the two unique polyketides needed in the backbone of HSAF using malonyl-CoA as both the starter and extender unit, while the NRPS module is responsible for the linking of the polyketides to an L-ornithine unit and the initial cyclization to create the tetramate back bone.  The coding region related to HSAF production contains a PKS-NRPS with a total of 9 domains, (KS-AT-DH-KR-ACP-C-A-PCP-TE), while a cascade of FAD-dependent redox reactions (OX1-OX4) flank the PKS-NRPS cluster proposed to be responsible for formation of the 5,5,6-tricyclic system, there are additional coding regions for a putative regulator, an arginase for L-ornithine production from Arginine, and a transporter which flank the PKS-NRPS.

References 

Polyketides